Theoretical physics is a branch of physics that employs mathematical models and abstractions of physical objects and systems to rationalize, explain and predict natural phenomena. This is in contrast to experimental physics, which uses experimental tools to probe these phenomena.

The advancement of science generally depends on the interplay between experimental studies and theory. In some cases, theoretical physics adheres to standards of mathematical rigour while giving little weight to experiments and observations. For example, while developing special relativity, Albert Einstein was concerned with the Lorentz transformation which left Maxwell's equations invariant, but was apparently uninterested in the Michelson–Morley experiment on Earth's drift through a luminiferous aether. Conversely, Einstein was awarded the Nobel Prize for explaining the photoelectric effect, previously an experimental result lacking a theoretical formulation.

Overview
A physical theory is a model of physical events. It is judged by the extent to which its predictions agree with empirical observations. The quality of a physical theory is also judged on its ability to make new predictions which can be verified by new observations. A physical theory differs from a mathematical theorem in that while both are based on some form of axioms, judgment of mathematical applicability is not based on agreement with any experimental results. A physical theory similarly differs from a mathematical theory, in the sense that the word "theory" has a different meaning in mathematical terms.

A physical theory involves one or more relationships between various measurable quantities. Archimedes realized that a ship floats by displacing its mass of water, Pythagoras understood the relation between the length of a vibrating string and the musical tone it produces. Other examples include entropy as a measure of the uncertainty regarding the positions and motions of unseen particles and the quantum mechanical idea that (action and) energy are not continuously variable.

Theoretical physics consists of several different approaches. In this regard, theoretical particle physics forms a good example. For instance: "phenomenologists" might employ (semi-) empirical formulas and heuristics to agree with experimental results, often without deep physical understanding. "Modelers" (also called "model-builders") often appear much like phenomenologists, but try to model speculative theories that have certain desirable features (rather than on experimental data), or apply the techniques of mathematical modeling  to physics problems.  Some attempt to create approximate theories, called effective theories, because fully developed theories may be regarded as unsolvable or too complicated. Other theorists may try to unify, formalise, reinterpret or generalise extant theories, or create completely new ones altogether. Sometimes the vision provided by pure mathematical systems can provide clues to how a physical system might be modeled; e.g., the notion, due to Riemann and others, that space itself might be curved. Theoretical problems that need computational investigation are often the concern of computational physics.

Theoretical advances may consist in setting aside old, incorrect paradigms (e.g., aether theory of light propagation, caloric theory of heat, burning consisting of evolving phlogiston, or astronomical bodies revolving around the Earth) or may be an alternative model that provides answers that are more accurate or that can be more widely applied. In the latter case, a correspondence principle will be required to recover the previously known result.  Sometimes though, advances may proceed along different paths. For example, an essentially correct theory may need some conceptual or factual revisions; atomic theory, first postulated millennia ago (by several thinkers in Greece and India) and the two-fluid theory of electricity  are two cases in this point. However, an exception to all the above is the wave–particle duality,  a theory combining aspects of different, opposing models via the Bohr complementarity principle.

Physical theories become accepted if they are able to make correct predictions and no (or few) incorrect ones. The theory should have, at least as a secondary objective, a certain economy and elegance (compare to mathematical beauty), a notion sometimes called "Occam's razor" after the 13th-century English philosopher William of Occam (or Ockham), in which the simpler of two theories that describe the same matter just as adequately is preferred (but conceptual simplicity may mean mathematical complexity). They are also more likely to be accepted if they connect a wide range of phenomena. Testing the consequences of a theory is part of the scientific method.

Physical theories can be grouped into three categories: mainstream theories, proposed theories and fringe theories.

History

Theoretical physics began at least 2,300 years ago, under the Pre-socratic philosophy, and continued by Plato and Aristotle, whose views held sway for a millennium. During the rise of medieval universities, the only acknowledged intellectual disciplines were the seven liberal arts of the Trivium like grammar, logic, and rhetoric and of the Quadrivium like arithmetic, geometry, music and astronomy. During the Middle Ages and Renaissance, the concept of experimental science, the counterpoint to theory, began with scholars such as Ibn al-Haytham and Francis Bacon. As the Scientific Revolution gathered pace, the concepts of matter, energy, space, time and causality slowly began to acquire the form we know today, and other sciences spun off from the rubric of natural philosophy. Thus began the modern era of theory with the Copernican paradigm shift in astronomy, soon followed by Johannes Kepler's expressions for planetary orbits, which summarized the meticulous observations of Tycho Brahe; the works of these men (alongside Galileo's) can perhaps be considered to constitute the Scientific Revolution.

The great push toward the modern concept of explanation started with Galileo, one of the few physicists who was both a consummate theoretician and a great experimentalist. The analytic geometry and mechanics of Descartes were incorporated into the calculus and mechanics of Isaac Newton, another theoretician/experimentalist of the highest order, writing Principia Mathematica. In it contained a grand synthesis of the work of Copernicus, Galileo and Kepler; as well as Newton's theories of mechanics and gravitation, which held sway as worldviews until the early 20th century. Simultaneously, progress was also made in optics (in particular colour theory and the ancient science of geometrical optics), courtesy of Newton, Descartes and the Dutchmen Snell and Huygens. In the 18th and 19th centuries Joseph-Louis Lagrange, Leonhard Euler and William Rowan Hamilton would extend the theory of classical mechanics considerably. They picked up the interactive intertwining of mathematics and physics begun two millennia earlier by Pythagoras.

Among the great conceptual achievements of the 19th and 20th centuries were the consolidation of the idea of energy (as well as its global conservation) by the inclusion of heat, electricity and magnetism, and then light. The laws of thermodynamics, and most importantly the introduction of the singular concept of entropy began to provide a macroscopic explanation for the properties of matter. Statistical mechanics (followed by statistical physics and Quantum statistical mechanics) emerged as an offshoot of thermodynamics late in the 19th century. Another important event in the 19th century was the discovery of electromagnetic theory, unifying the previously separate phenomena of electricity, magnetism and light.

The pillars of modern physics, and perhaps the most revolutionary theories in the history of physics, have been relativity theory and quantum mechanics. Newtonian mechanics was subsumed under special relativity and Newton's gravity was given a kinematic explanation by general relativity. Quantum mechanics led to an understanding of blackbody radiation (which indeed, was an original motivation for the theory) and of anomalies in the specific heats of solids — and finally to an understanding of the internal structures of atoms and molecules. Quantum mechanics soon gave way to the formulation of quantum field theory (QFT), begun in the late 1920s. In the aftermath of World War 2, more progress brought much renewed interest in QFT, which had since the early efforts, stagnated.  The same period also saw fresh attacks on the problems of superconductivity and phase transitions, as well as the first applications of QFT in the area of theoretical condensed matter. The 1960s and 70s saw the formulation of the Standard model of particle physics using QFT and progress in condensed matter physics (theoretical foundations of superconductivity and critical phenomena, among others), in parallel to the applications of relativity to problems in astronomy and cosmology respectively.

All of these achievements depended on the theoretical physics as a moving force both to suggest experiments and to consolidate results — often by ingenious application of existing mathematics, or, as in the case of Descartes and Newton (with Leibniz), by inventing new mathematics. Fourier's studies of heat conduction led to a new branch of mathematics: infinite, orthogonal series.

Modern theoretical physics attempts to unify theories and explain phenomena in further attempts to understand the Universe, from the cosmological to the elementary particle scale. Where experimentation cannot be done, theoretical physics still tries to advance through the use of mathematical models.

Mainstream theories
Mainstream theories (sometimes referred to as central theories) are the body of knowledge of both factual and scientific views and possess a usual scientific quality of the tests of repeatability, consistency with existing well-established science and experimentation. There do exist mainstream theories that are generally accepted theories based solely upon their effects explaining a wide variety of data, although the detection, explanation, and possible composition are subjects of debate.

Examples

 Analog models of gravity
 Big Bang
 Causality
 Chaos theory
 Classical field theory
 Classical mechanics
 Condensed matter physics (including solid state physics  and the electronic structure of materials)
 Conservation law
 Conservation of angular momentum
 Conservation of energy
 Conservation of mass
 Conservation of momentum
 Continuum mechanics
 Cosmic censorship hypothesis
 Cosmological Constant
 CPT symmetry
 Dark matter
 Dynamics
 Dynamo theory
 Electromagnetism
 Electroweak interaction
 Field theory
 Fluctuation theorem
 Fluid dynamics
 Fluid mechanics
 Fundamental interaction
 General relativity
 Gravitational constant
 Heisenberg's uncertainty principle
 Kinetic theory of gases
 Laws of thermodynamics
 Maxwell's equations
 Newton's laws of motion
 Pauli exclusion principle
 Perturbation theory (quantum mechanics)
 Physical cosmology
 Planck constant
 Poincaré recurrence theorem
 Quantum biology
 Quantum chaos
 Quantum chromodynamics
 Quantum complexity theory
 Quantum computing
 Quantum dynamics
 Quantum electrochemistry
 Quantum electrodynamics
 Quantum field theory
 Quantum field theory in curved spacetime
 Quantum geometry
 Quantum information theory
 Quantum logic
 Quantum mechanics
 Quantum optics
 Quantum physics
 Quantum thermodynamics
 Relativistic quantum mechanics
 Scattering theory
 Solid mechanics
 Special relativity
 Spin–statistics theorem
 Spontaneous symmetry breaking
 Standard Model
 Statistical mechanics
 Statistical physics
 Theory of relativity
 Thermodynamics
 Wave–particle duality
 Weak interaction

Proposed theories
The proposed theories of physics are usually relatively new theories which deal with the study of physics which include scientific approaches, means for determining the validity of models and new types of reasoning used to arrive at the theory. However, some proposed theories include theories that have been around for decades and have eluded methods of discovery and testing. Proposed theories can include fringe theories in the process of becoming established (and, sometimes, gaining wider acceptance). Proposed theories usually have not been tested. In addition to the theories like those listed below, there are also different interpretations of quantum mechanics, which may or may not be considered different theories since it is debatable whether they yield different predictions for physical experiments, even in principle. For example, AdS/CFT correspondence, Chern–Simons theory, graviton, magnetic monopole, string theory, theory of everything.

Fringe theories
Fringe theories include any new area of scientific endeavor in the process of becoming established and some proposed theories. It can include speculative sciences. This includes physics fields and physical theories presented in accordance with known evidence, and a body of associated predictions have been made according to that theory.

Some fringe theories go on to become a widely accepted part of physics. Other fringe theories end up being disproven. Some fringe theories are a form of protoscience and others are a form of pseudoscience. The falsification of the original theory sometimes leads to reformulation of the theory.

Examples

 Aether (classical element)
Luminiferous aether
 Digital physics
 Electrogravitics
 Stochastic electrodynamics
 Tesla's dynamic theory of gravity

Thought experiments vs real experiments

"Thought" experiments are situations created in one's mind, asking a question akin to "suppose you are in this situation, assuming such is true, what would follow?". They are usually created to investigate phenomena that are not readily experienced in every-day situations. Famous examples of such thought experiments are Schrödinger's cat, the EPR thought experiment, simple illustrations of time dilation, and so on. These usually lead to real experiments designed to verify that the conclusion (and therefore the assumptions) of the thought experiments are correct. The EPR thought experiment led to the Bell inequalities, which were then tested to various degrees of rigor, leading to the acceptance of the current formulation of quantum mechanics and probabilism as a working hypothesis.

See also
 List of theoretical physicists
 Philosophy of physics
 Symmetry in quantum mechanics
 Timeline of developments in theoretical physics

Notes

References

Further reading

Duhem, Pierre. La théorie physique - Son objet, sa structure, (in French). 2nd edition - 1914. English translation: The physical theory - its purpose, its structure. Republished by Joseph Vrin philosophical bookstore (1981), .
 Feynman, et al. The Feynman Lectures on Physics (3 vol.). First edition: Addison–Wesley, (1964, 1966).
Bestselling three-volume textbook covering the span of physics. Reference for both (under)graduate student and professional researcher alike.
 Landau et al. Course of Theoretical Physics.
 Famous series of books dealing with theoretical concepts in physics covering 10 volumes, translated into many languages and reprinted over many editions. Often known simply as "Landau and Lifschits" or "Landau-Lifschits" in the literature.
 Longair, MS. Theoretical Concepts in Physics: An Alternative View of Theoretical Reasoning in Physics. Cambridge University Press; 2d edition (4 Dec 2003). . 
 Planck, Max (1909). Eight Lectures on theoretical physics. Library of Alexandria. , .
 A set of lectures given in 1909 at Columbia University.
 Sommerfeld, Arnold. Vorlesungen über theoretische Physik (Lectures on Theoretical Physics); German, 6 volumes.
A series of lessons from a master educator of theoretical physicists.

External links

MIT Center for Theoretical Physics
How to become a GOOD Theoretical Physicist, a website made by Gerard 't Hooft

 

de:Physik#Theoretische Physik